Grebenje is a small settlement in the hills south of Velike Lašče in southern Slovenia. It lies in the Municipality of Ribnica. The entire municipality is part of the traditional region of Lower Carniola and is now included in the Southeast Slovenia Statistical Region.

References

External links

Grebenje on Geopedia

Populated places in the Municipality of Ribnica